IFL may refer to:

American football
Intense Football League, (2004–2008) in the United States, merged into the Indoor Football League
Indoor Football League, (2008–present) in the United States
Intercontinental Football League, a European league proposed by the NFL in the 1970s
Israel Football League, (2007–present) in Israel
Italian Football League, (2008–present) in Italy

Association football
Indonesian Futsal League
Indian Football League, a precursor of India's I-League
Irish Football League, Northern Ireland

Other
Interflug (1963–1990), national airline of East Germany
International Fight League, a former American mixed martial arts league
Imperial Fascist League, British fascist group of the 1930s
Imperial Federation League, advocated consolidation of the British Empire
Intact forest landscape
Integrated Facility for Linux, an IBM mainframe processor for the Linux operating system
Baylor Institute for Faith and Learning, division of a Baptist university in Texas
IFL (chemotherapy), a chemotherapy regimen
Institute for Learning, a defunct UK body intended to promote teaching
Indian Federation of Labour (1941–1948), a British-supported federation of Indian trade unions
International Ferro Metals, a ferrochrome producer operating in South Africa
Innisfail Airport, IATA airport code "IFL"